AS Police is a Burkinabé football team based in Ouagadougou which competes in the Burkinabé Premier League.

References

Football clubs in Burkina Faso
Police association football clubs